Murray Dry is an American political scientist specializing in American constitutional law, American political thought, political philosophy, freedom of speech, freedom of religion, federalism, separation of powers, and the American founding.

Dry helped compile The Complete Anti-Federalist with his former teacher Herbert Storing. He is currently the Charles A. Dana Professor of Political Science at Middlebury College, having earned his BA, MA, and Ph.D at the University of Chicago, where he studied under Storing and Leo Strauss, among others. For the 2009–2010 academic year, he was a visiting professor at Yeshiva University. His current area of research is in the constitutionality of same-sex marriage, and he recently published a book on that subject.

Murray Dry has taught many leading scholars of American government, political philosophy, and law, among them Suzanna Sherry (Vanderbilt University Law School), Dan Kahan (Yale Law School), James Stoner (Louisiana State University), Peter Minowitz (Santa Clara University), Paul O. Carrese (United States Air Force Academy), Ayse Zarakol (Washington and Lee University), James Morone (Brown University), Barry Sullivan (Loyola University), Giorgi Areshidze (Claremont McKenna College), Nicholas Sambanis (University of Pennsylvania), Odysseus Makridis (Fairleigh Dickinson University), and Victor Abundis (Academic of Classics) (Park Hill High School)

Also among his former students are former Governor of Vermont Jim Douglas, Congressman Frank Pallone, Congresswoman Barbara Comstock, and former White House Press Secretary Ari Fleischer.

Works
 (2004)
 (1981)
 (2006)

References

Living people
Year of birth missing (living people)
Political science educators
Middlebury College faculty
Place of birth missing (living people)
University of Chicago alumni
American political scientists